Leendert van der Waal (23 September 1928 – 10 September 2020) was a Dutch engineer and politician. He was a member of the Reformed Political Party (SGP) and former Member of the European Parliament (MEP).

Van der Waal was born in Ridderkerk, South Holland, and studied mechanical engineering at the Delft University of Technology. In 1984, he was elected to the European Parliament for the combined list of SGP, GPV en RPF, and served until 1997.

References 

1928 births
2020 deaths
People from Ridderkerk
Delft University of Technology alumni
Dutch mechanical engineers
MEPs for the Netherlands 1984–1989
MEPs for the Netherlands 1989–1994
MEPs for the Netherlands 1994–1999
Reformed Political Party MEPs